Charles Barnes (16 October 1882 – 12 August 1947) was an Australian cricketer. He played twenty-seven first-class matches for New South Wales between 1904/05 and 1912/13.

See also
 List of New South Wales representative cricketers

References

External links
 

1882 births
1947 deaths
Australian cricketers
New South Wales cricketers
Cricketers from Sydney